They Came to a City is a 1944 British film directed by Basil Dearden adapted from the 1943 play of the same title by J. B. Priestley. It stars John Clements, Googie Withers, Raymond Huntley, Renee Gadd, A. E. Matthews and others, and is notable for including a cameo guest appearance by Priestley as himself. The plot concerns the experiences of various people who have come to live in their "ideal" city, and explores their hopes and reasons for doing so. Many of the cast had also performed their roles in the original stage play. The film's art direction was by Michael Relph.

Cast

John Clements as Joe Dinmore
Googie Withers as Alice Foster
Raymond Huntley as Malcolm Stritton
Renee Gadd as Dorothy Stritton
A. E. Matthews as Sir George Gedney
Mabel Terry Lewis as Lady Loxfield
Frances Rowe as Philippa Loxfield
Ada Reeve as Mrs Batley
Norman Shelley as Cudworth
J.B. Priestley as himself

Critical reception
In The New York Times, Bosley Crowther wrote, "as symbolism and an outlet for Priestley's philosophy, "They Came to a City" is eloquent and courageous, but as a motion picture it is immobile."

References

1945 films
1945 drama films
Ealing Studios films
Films directed by Basil Dearden
Films produced by Michael Balcon
British drama films
British black-and-white films
Films with screenplays by Basil Dearden
British films based on plays
1944 drama films
1944 films
1940s British films